Gerda Kieninger (21 February 1951 – 22 January 2020) was a German politician. She was a member of the Social Democratic Party of Germany. She was born in Castrop-Rauxel, Germany. Kieninger was a member of the Landtag of North Rhine-Westphalia from 1995 to 2017.

Kieninger died in Cologne on 22 January 2020 at the age of 68 in Cologne, Germany at the age of 68.

References

1951 births
2020 deaths
Politicians from Cologne
Members of the Landtag of North Rhine-Westphalia
Social Democratic Party of Germany politicians